Canvas is a 2006 drama film written and directed by Joseph Greco about a Florida family dealing with a mother who has schizophrenia. The film premiered October 2006 at the Hamptons International Film Festival in New York.

Cast
 Joe Pantoliano as John Marino
 Marcia Gay Harden as Mary Marino
 Devon Gearhart as Chris Marino
 Sophia Bairley as Dawn
 Marcus Johns as Sam
 Antony Del Rio as Gregg

Production
Director Joseph Greco wrote that during the third week of shooting, on October 24, 2005, Hurricane Wilma "hammered us" and almost shut down the production of the film. In a statement on the official website, Greco also wrote he was one of James Cameron's three assistants during the production of the film Titanic and when Canvas was finished, James Cameron signed Greco's application to join the Directors Guild of America.

Release
The film premiered at the Hamptons International Film Festival in October 2006 and was shown later that year at the Fort Lauderdale International Film Festival on November 12, 2006. It premiered in Germany on February 10, 2007, at the European Film Market and premiered in France on May 21, 2007, at the Cannes Film Market. Canvas has also been shown at the AFI Dallas International Film Festival, the Sedona International Film Festival, the Nantucket Film Festival, and the Sarasota Film Festival.

The film opened in limited release in the United States on October 12, 2007.

Critical reception
As of October 13, 2007 on the review aggregator Rotten Tomatoes, 80% of critics gave the film positive reviews, based on 15 reviews. On Metacritic, the film had an average score of 69 out of 100, based on 9 reviews.

Roger Ebert of the Chicago Sun-Times gave the film 3 stars and wrote "The portrayal of schizophrenia in the film has been praised by mental health experts as unusually accurate and sympathetic" and also said "Writer-director Joseph Greco says the film, his first feature, was influenced by his own childhood with a schizophrenic mother."

Awards
At the Fort Lauderdale International Film Festival, the film won the Audience Award and Joe Pantoliano won the Best Dramatic Performance Award. At the Sedona International Film Festival, the film won the Best Feature Film Award and Joe Pantoliano won the Outstanding Acting Award. The film also won Audience Awards at the Nantucket Film Festival and the Sarasota Film Festival.

References

External links
 
 
 
 
 
 

2006 films
2006 drama films
American drama films
Fictional portrayals of schizophrenia
Films set in Florida
2000s English-language films
2000s American films